Flesh Will Surrender is a 1947 Italian drama film directed by Alberto Lattuada. It is based on the novel Giovanni Episcopo by Gabriele D'Annunzio. It was entered into the 1947 Cannes Film Festival.

Plot
Giovanni Episcopo is a modest clerk, shy and awkward. The man does not know that he is going to be punished forever by fate. In fact, Giovanni falls in love with Ginevra. The two get married, generate a son, and go to live in a house that Giovanni buys with his savings. A friend of Giovanni's, Giulio Wanzer, who had a love affair with Ginevra, is determined to ruin his life. The character of Ginevra changes and becomes more cruel and aggressive, and when Giulio, at the height of presumption, is installed in the home of Giovanni and is aggressive with Ginevra and their son, Giovanni goes mad with rage and kills Giulio.

Cast
 Aldo Fabrizi as Giovanni Episcopo
 Roldano Lupi as Giulio Wanzer
 Yvonne Sanson as Ginevra Canale
 Ave Ninchi as Emilia Canale
 Amedeo Fabrizi as Ciro Episcopo
 Nando Bruno as Antonio
 Alberto Sordi as Doberti
 Francesco De Marco as Canale
 Lia Grani as Signora Adele
 Maria Gonnelli as Santina
 Gino Cavalieri as Archive Director
 Gian Luca Cortese as Marquess Arguti (as Luca Cortese)
 Folco Lulli as Carlini
 Galeazzo Benti as Cavalry Officer
 Silvana Mangano as Dancer
 Gina Lollobrigida as Dancer

References

External links

1947 films
1947 drama films
1940s Italian-language films
Italian drama films
Italian black-and-white films
Films based on works by Gabriele D'Annunzio
Films directed by Alberto Lattuada
Films scored by Nino Rota
Films with screenplays by Federico Fellini
Films with screenplays by Suso Cecchi d'Amico
1940s Italian films